The Sauber C12 was the car with which the Sauber Formula One team made its FIA Formula One World Championship debut in 1993. Its design was led by Leo Ress.

Engine 
Power was provided by a Sauber-branded 3.5-litre V10 built by Ilmor in partnership with Mercedes. The C12 was given the prominence of "Concept by Mercedes-Benz" stickers on the engine cowling due to the two parties' close relationship from their World Sportscar Championship program. The engines were re-branded in 1994 to reflect the partnership.

Drivers 
Karl Wendlinger was re-united with his former WSC team in preparation for its Grand Prix debut. He already had two seasons of Formula One experience, having made his debut in the 1991 Japanese Grand Prix with Leyton House, while JJ Lehto (Jyrki Järvilehto) had started 38 Grands Prix (not including failures to qualify) between 1989 and 1992.

Racing history 
Lehto contributed to a promising start with a 5th-place finish in the South African GP at Kyalami and improved on that with a 4th place classification at Imola, home of the San Marino GP, despite an engine problem.

The C12 had a somewhat mixed record with a total of 12 DNFs due to mechanical failure, including seven engine failures (not including Imola, where Lehto was classified as a finisher). Driver-related incidents accounted for six more DNFs.

The C12 achieved six points finishes and eight non-scoring finishes from 32 starts. It achieved a points total of 12 and 7th place in the Constructors' World Championship standings. 

It was replaced at the start of the  season by the Sauber C13.

Complete Formula One results
(key) (results in bold indicate pole position)

References

External links 

 Sauber C12 Photo Gallery
 Sauber C12 Technical Data

1993 Formula One season cars
C12